Austin and Paley was the title of a practice of architects in Lancaster, Lancashire, England, in the late 19th and early 20th centuries.  The practice had been founded in 1836 by Edmund Sharpe.  The architects during the period covered by this list are Hubert Austin and Henry Paley.  Henry Paley had joined the practice as a partner in 1886 when his father, E. G. Paley, was Austin's partner ; the practice then became known as Paley, Austin and Paley.  E. G. Paley died in 1895 and the practice continued under the title of Austin and Paley.  Austin's son joined the practice as a partner in 1914.

This list covers the ecclesiastical works executed by the practice during the partnership of Hubert Austin and Henry Paley between 1895 and 1914.  These works include new churches, restorations and alterations of older churches, additions to churches, and church fittings and furniture.  The practice designed about 28 new churches and restored or modified many more.  Because of the location of the practice, most of their ecclesiastical work was in the areas that are now Cumbria, Lancashire, and Greater Manchester, but examples can also be found in 
Cheshire, Merseyside, North Yorkshire, Staffordshire, County Durham, Nottinghamshire, and Hertfordshire.

Key

Works

See also
 Lists of works by Sharpe, Paley and Austin

References
Citations

Sources

Gothic Revival architecture
Austin and Paley